St Joseph's College (sometimes referred to colloquially as Joeys or SJC) is an independent Catholic secondary school for boys, located in the inner Geelong suburb of Newtown, Victoria, Australia. The school was founded by the Congregation of Christian Brothers in 1935, who continue to run the school, and provides education from year 7–12, offering a broad range of curricular choices for its students in middle and senior schools including VCE, VET and VCAL.

In 2014 the Year 9 Westcourt Campus began operation, and the Joseph Innovation Trade Training Centre also commenced classes offering a broad range of study options. The current principal is Tony Paatsch. The two Deputy Principals are Michelle Broderick (Years 7 to 9) and Mark Kennedy (Years 10 to 12).

History
Edmund Rice of Waterford, Ireland founded the congregation of Christian Brothers in 1802 for the Christian education of boys, particularly those from less affluent backgrounds. St Joseph's College Geelong was founded in 1935 by the Christian Brothers as a day school and, by 1940, had added a boarding school. Today it is a day school only, providing a comprehensive education for boys within the Geelong Region. The college's motto Ad Alta Virtute in Latin, translates as 'Strive for the Highest' in English.

Campuses

Edmund Rice Campus
The Edmund Rice campus of St Joseph's College is located on Aphrasia Street, in the suburb of Newtown.

Westcourt Campus
The Westcourt campus of St Joseph's College is located on Minerva Road, in the suburb of Herne Hill. The campus caters for Year 9 students and has a chapel on the campus, that opened in 2016.

House system
St Joseph's College runs a house system which is based on points earned. There are four houses at St Joseph's College:
Brophy, Butler, Foley and Jordan. Each house is named in honour of four Brothers who gave outstanding service to the college. Upon entering Year 7, all boys attending St Joseph's are assigned a house. There is a house captain and vice for each house. The houses compete for the Adam Bryant Memorial House Competition Shield, awarded in memory of Adam, a student between 1982 – 1992 and former House Captain at St Joseph's College, who died as a result of a car accident in 1993. Points are awarded for participation in a variety of activities and initiatives throughout the school year, including swimming and athletics days, Edmund Rice Day, Blood Bank, Peter Larkins Hill Run and many more. The houses are as follows:

Sport 
St Joseph's is a member of the Associated Catholic Colleges (ACC).

St Joseph's has won the following ACC premierships:

 Cricket - 2020
 Cross Country - 2017
 Football (6) - 1994, 2006, 2007, 2010, 2015, 2016
 Golf - 2018
 Soccer (4) - 2005, 2006, 2009, 2013

Notable alumni

Entertainment, media and the arts
 Mark Beretta – journalist; former ten-time Australian champion in water skiing
 Mitch Cleary – sports reporter, Channel 9
 Peter Larkins – sports doctor and presenter on The Sunday Footy Show
 Xavier Rudd – folk singer

Politics, religion, welfare, public service and the law
 The Hon. Justice Bernard Bongiorno  – Supreme Court Judge
 John Hyde – former Member for Perth, former Shadow Minister for Culture and the Arts; Multicultural Interests; Planning; Heritage

Sports
 Jimmy Bartel – Australian rules footballer for Geelong Cats
 Damian Bourke – former Australian rules footballer for Geelong Cats and Brisbane Bears
 Tim Bourke – former Australian rules footballer for Geelong Cats
 Allen Christensen – Australian rules footballer for Brisbane Lions and Geelong Cats
 Luke Dahlhaus – Australian rules footballer for Geelong Cats
 Tom Doedee –  Australian rules footballer for Adelaide
 Brayden Ham – Australian rules footballer for Essendon
 Jack Henry – Australian rules footballer for Geelong Cats
 Shaun Higgins – Australian rules footballer for North Melbourne
 Cameron Johnston – NFL player for Philadelphia Eagles and Houston Texans
 Cameron Ling – Australian rules footballer for Geelong Cats
 Matt Ling – Australian rules footballer playing for Sydney Swans
 Patrick McCartin – Australian rules footballer for St. Kilda Saints
 Tom McCartin, Australian rules footballer for Sydney Swans
 Nick Maxwell – Australian rules footballer for Collingwood Magpies
 Jackson Nelson – Australian rules footballer
 Jasper Pittard – Australian rules footballer for Port Adelaide
 Matthew Scarlett – Australian rules footballer for Geelong Cats
 Sam Simpson – Australian rules footballer for Geelong Cats
 George Sotiropoulos – MMA fighter in the lightweight division of the UFC
 Josh Spence – baseball player; MLB pitcher for the San Diego Padres
 Matthew Spiranovic – soccer player; represented the Socceroos and Qatar Stars League team Al-Arabi
 Tom Stewart – Australian rules footballer for Geelong Cats
 Barry Stoneham – former Australian rules footballer for  Geelong Cats
 Oliver Henry - Australian rules footballer for Geelong
 Sam Walsh – Australian rules footballer for Carlton Blues
 Ned Reeves- Australian rules footballer for Hawthorn
 Tanner Bruhn-Australian rules footballer
 Charlie Lazzaro- Australian rules footballer

See also

 List of schools in Victoria, Australia
 Sacred Heart College, Geelong
 Catholic education in Australia

References

External links
 St Joseph's College Geelong Website

Schools in Geelong
Congregation of Christian Brothers secondary schools in Australia
Associated Catholic Colleges
Boys' schools in Victoria (Australia)
Educational institutions established in 1890
Catholic secondary schools in Victoria (Australia)
1890 establishments in Australia